Wang Yuanping (born 8 December 1976) is a retired Chinese athlete who specialised in the 800 metres. She won several medals at the regional level.

Her personal bests in the event are 2:00.63 seconds outdoors (Jinzhou 2000) and 2:03.41 seconds indoors (Yokohama 2004).

Competition record

References

 

Living people
1976 births
Chinese female middle-distance runners
Athletes (track and field) at the 1998 Asian Games
Athletes (track and field) at the 2002 Asian Games
Asian Games medalists in athletics (track and field)
Asian Games bronze medalists for China
Medalists at the 1998 Asian Games